The Shadow Cabinet of Thailand ( is an unofficial group of senior opposition party's spokespeople who form an alternative cabinet to the government. The shadow cabinet members shadow or mark each individual member of the government. Although the Leader of the Opposition is an officially appointed position, the shadow cabinet currently bears no legal status. , shadow cabinets have only been formed twice, both times by the Democrat Party.

After the People's Power Party's victory in the 2007 general election, the Democrat Party became the sole official opposition party. Abhisit Vejjajiva, leader of the Democrat Party, expressed his intention to set up a shadow cabinet to track the new administration's performance, to propose better solutions, and to provide the Democrat's standpoint on each government decision. The shadow cabinet line-up was announced on February 8, 2008 after the Samak's administration had officially assumed office. On 15 December 2008, Abhisit was elected by the House of Representatives to become the next Prime Minister, with many of the members of his new cabinet drawn from the shadow cabinet. A day later, the main opposition Pheu Thai Party MP Jatuporn Prompan stated that his party would not be forming a shadow cabinet.  After the 2011 elections, the Pheu Thai Party won the election under the leadership of Yingluck Shinawatra, and the Democrat Party was once again the main opposition party with Abhisit as its leader, which led to the formation of a second shadow cabinet by Abhisit.

Members
Abhisit Vejjajiva's 2nd shadow cabinet, active from 6 September 2011 - 7 May 2014.

See also
 Shadow Cabinet
 Cabinet of Thailand
 Leader of the Opposition (Thailand)

References

Politics of Thailand
Thailand